The Frankfort micropolitan area may refer to:

The Frankfort, Indiana micropolitan area, United States
The Frankfort, Kentucky micropolitan area, United States

See also
Frankfort (disambiguation)